The FIS Alpine World Ski Championships 1937 in alpine skiing were the seventh edition of the competition, organized by the International Ski Federation (FIS), and were held in Chamonix, France in February 1937.

Medal summary

Men's events

Women's events

Medal table

References

1937 in alpine skiing
1937 in French sport
1937
International sports competitions hosted by France
Alpine skiing competitions in France
February 1937 sports events